The  is an annual ultramarathon sporting event in Yamanashi Prefecture and Shizuoka Prefecture, Japan, started in 2012. The total distance is 165.4 km with 7,577m of cumulative altitude gain, and the time limit is 46 hours. It is a sister sport event of Ultra-Trail du Mont-Blanc.

There are two categories of race under the banner of Ultra-Trail Mt. Fuji: "UTMF" (Ultra-Trail Mt. Fuji), is the full course around Mount Fuji, and the "KAI69k", a 69.2 km race with 3,638m of altitude gain.

Course
The 165 km course starts and ends at the Yagizaki Park in Fuji-Kawaguchi-ko Town in Yamanashi Prefecture, circulating around Mount Fuji, cumulatively gaining 7,577m of altitude. Time limit is 46 hours. The participants are limited to those over 18 years old, and need to submit a proof of earning sufficient points by finishing other trail races.

Results

References

External links 
 
Course Map / Altitude Graph
Calendar of Ultramarathons in Japan

Athletics competitions in Japan
Annual sporting events in Japan
Recurring sporting events established in 2012
Ultra-Trail World Tour
Trail running competitions